Gray County is the name of two counties in the United States:
Gray County, Kansas
Gray County, Texas

See also
 Grey County (disambiguation)